Rashid Ali al-Gaylani (1892–1965) was Prime Minister of Iraq.

Rashid Ali may also refer to:
 Rashid Ali (singer), Indian singer, guitarist and musician
 Rashid Ali (cricketer, born 1962) (born 1962), Pakistani cricketer for Islamabad
 Rashid Ali (cricketer, born 1980) (born 1980), Pakistani cricketer for Pakistan Reserves
 Rashid Ali (Quetta cricketer), Pakistani cricketer for Quetta
 Rashid Ali (Bahawalpur cricketer), Pakistani cricketer for Bahawalpur
 Rashid Ali (Water and Power Development Authority cricketer) , Pakistani cricketer for Water and Power Development Authority
 Rashid Alievich Sunyaev (born 1943), Tatar scientist

See also
 Rashied Ali (1933–2009), American free jazz drummer